Monactis is a genus of South American flowering plants in the tribe Heliantheae within the family Asteraceae.

 Species

 formerly included
Monactis subdeltoidea B.L.Rob. - Kingianthus paniculatus (Turcz.) H.Rob.

References

 
Flora of South America
Asteraceae genera
Taxonomy articles created by Polbot